Parapenaeopsis sculptilis, commonly known as the Rainbow Shrimp, is a marine crustacean that is widely reared for food.

Distribution 
Its natural distribution is the Indo-West Pacific.

External links 
 WoRMS

Penaeidae
Edible crustaceans
Commercial crustaceans
Crustaceans described in 1798
Taxa named by Johan Christian Fabricius